Sir Andrew John Cash  (born 14 October 1955) was Chief Executive of Sheffield Teaching Hospitals NHS Foundation Trust. He retired from the role early 2019.

He was educated at Bristol Grammar School, the University of East Anglia (BA, Economic and Social History) and the University of Leeds.

Cash was appointed an Officer of the British Empire (OBE) in the 2001 New Year Honours.

He was knighted in the 2009 Birthday Honours.

He was appointed as a Knight of Justice of the Order of St John (K.StJ) on  29 January 2020.

In 2015 the Health Service Journal judged him as the second to top Chief Executive in the National Health Service.

References

1955 births
Living people
People educated at Bristol Grammar School
Alumni of the University of East Anglia
Alumni of the University of Leeds
British medical administrators
Administrators in the National Health Service
English healthcare chief executives
Officers of the Order of the British Empire
Knights of Justice of the Order of St John
Knights Bachelor
Place of birth missing (living people)